Beth Robertson Fiddes is a contemporary Scottish artist.

Raised on Tiree and in Kingussie, Robertson Fiddes graduated from the Edinburgh College of Art in 1995 with a degree in sculpture. She won the 1997 Benno Schotz Award and second in the 2011 Jolomo Bank of Scotland Awards for her Scottish landscape painting. She is best known for her paintings of the West Highands and Islands of Scotland, as well as her works featuring the south coast of Iceland. In 2018, Scottish Field magazine described Robertson Fiddes as, "one of the most exciting landscape artists working in Scotland today."

References

External links
Official website
Kilmorack Gallery

Living people
Scottish artists
Year of birth missing (living people)
Alumni of the Edinburgh College of Art